Philippe Haezebrouck (born 7 November 1954), also known by his pseudonym "Steve Brooks", is a French racing driver from Reims. He currently competes in the Formula Renault 2.0 Northern European Cup series.

Racing record

Career summary

† As Haezebrouck was a guest driver, he was ineligible to score points.

Complete FIA GT Championship results
(key) (Races in bold indicate pole position) (Races in italics indicate fastest lap)

Complete 24 Hours of Le Mans results
(key) (Races in bold indicate pole position) (Races in italics indicate fastest lap)

24 Hours of Daytona
(key) (Races in bold indicate pole position) (Races in italics indicate fastest lap)

References

External links
 

1954 births
Living people
French racing drivers
Formula Renault 2.0 NEC drivers
24 Hours of Le Mans drivers
24H Series drivers
Nürburgring 24 Hours drivers
Rolex Sports Car Series drivers
World Touring Car Championship drivers
European Touring Car Championship drivers
FIA GT Championship drivers
FIA World Endurance Championship drivers
Blancpain Endurance Series drivers
Graff Racing drivers
Signature Team drivers
R-ace GP drivers
Saintéloc Racing drivers
Le Mans Cup drivers